A Welcome to Country is a ritual or formal ceremony performed as a land acknowledgement at many events held in Australia. It is intended to highlight the cultural significance of the surrounding area to the descendants of a particular Aboriginal clan or language group who were recognised as the original human inhabitants of the area. For the Welcome to be recognised as official, it must be performed by a recognised elder of the group. Welcomes to Country are sometimes accompanied by traditional smoking ceremonies, music or dance. Where an elder is not available to perform the Welcome, or there is not a recognised traditional owner, an Acknowledgement of Country may be offered instead.

The term "Country" has a particular meaning and significance to many Aboriginal peoples, encompassing an inter-dependent relationship between an individual or a people and their ancestral or traditional lands and seas. The connection to land involves culture, spirituality, language, law/lore, kin relationships and identity. The Welcome to Country has been a long tradition among Aboriginal Australian groups to welcome peoples from other areas. Today it serves also as a symbol which signifies the recognition of Aboriginal and Torres Strait Islander peoples' presence in Australia before colonisation and an end to their past exclusion from Australian history and society, aiding to reconciliation with Australia's First Nations.

Since 2008, a Welcome to Country has been incorporated into the ceremonial opening of the Parliament of Australia, occurring after each federal election.

History

Aboriginal history and relationship with land
In Aboriginal culture prior to European settlement, each clan's survival was dependent upon its understanding of food, water and other resources within its own country – a discrete area of land to which it had more or less exclusive claim. Traditional ownership has been legally recognised under native title in Australia since the Native Title Act 1993.

Connection to country (often spelt with a capital C) means more than just the land or waters in Aboriginal culture. There is no equivalent in the English language to describe that which permeates all aspects of existence: culture, spirituality, language, law, family and identity. Aboriginal people did not own land as property in the past, but their relationship to an area of land provides a deep sense of "identity, purpose and belonging", and is a relationship of reciprocity and respect. Country includes all living things in the environment: people, plants and animals. It also embraces the seasons, stories and creation spirits. " The history of a people with an area ("Country") can go back for thousands of years, and the relationship with the land is nurtured and sustained by cultural knowledge and by the environment. Disconnection from the land can impact health and wellbeing. This connection is also reflected in such phrases as "caring for country" or "living on country", and related to the importance of land rights and native title.

Evolution of the two greetings
Welcomes to Country are a form of Aboriginal ceremony dating back many thousands of years, used to welcome other peoples from other areas and as a cultural exchange. The Yolngu peoples engaged in the ceremony to welcome Dutch explorers in the seventeenth century, and with Makassan trepangers from the mid-eighteenth century. It is seen as a way of making newcomers feel comfortable and connected, and may be the basis for forging important future relationships.

The 1973 Aquarius Festival held in Nimbin, New South Wales, by the Australian Union of Students (AUS) has been documented as Australia's first publicly observed Welcome to Country, although it was not called this at the time. Organisers of the alternative lifestyle festival, considered Australia's "Woodstock", were challenged by Indigenous activist Gary Foley to seek permission from traditional owners to hold the festival on their land. San people from the Kalahari Desert in Southern Africa, including artist Bauxhau Stone, were sent out by AUS representatives to invite Aboriginal people to the festival, and funding from the Whitlam government paid for many busloads to travel to the festival. An estimated 200 to 800 Indigenous Australians attended the two-week festival, marking a significant kindling of relationships with Australia's counterculture. A ceremony was conducted by Uncle Lyle Roberts and song man Uncle Dickee Donnelly, the last known initiated men of the area.

The second recorded Welcome to Country occurred in 1976, when entertainers Ernie Dingo and Richard Walley developed a ceremony to welcome a group of Māori artists who were participating in the Perth International Arts Festival. The welcome, extended on behalf of the Noongar people, was intended to mirror the visitors' own traditions, while incorporating elements of Aboriginal culture. Walley recalled that Māori performers were uncomfortable performing their cultural act without having been acknowledged or welcomed by the people of the land.

Arts administrator Rhoda Roberts says that the Aboriginal National Theatre Trust was instrumental in developing both Welcomes and Acknowledgements to Country during the 1980s.

Acknowledgements of country are a more recent development, associated with the Keating government of the 1990s, the reconciliation movement and the creation of the Council for Aboriginal Reconciliation (CAR) with Yawuru man Pat Dodson as chair. After the Mabo case, in which the historical fiction of terra nullius was overturned and native title was recognised in Australia. According to Yorta Yorta and Dja Dja Wurrung man Tiriki Onus, head of the Wilin Centre for Indigenous Arts and Cultural Development at the University of Melbourne, it was after Mabo that Acknowledgement of Country grew among "grassroots communities concerned with issues of reconciliation". Wiradjuri woman Linda Burney, a member of the CAR in those days, says that there was no formal strategy to bring the Acknowledgement of Country into Australian life, but it just grew organically and became accepted as part of many types of gatherings. It is seen as a good way to engage people with Aboriginal and Torres Strait Islander people and culture, and the wider Australian community sees the relationship feels that its important to have a good relationship with Australia's Indigenous peoples.

Welcomes and Acknowledgements have since been incorporated into openings of meetings and other events across Australia, by all levels of government, universities, community groups, arts other organisations.

Since 2008, when it was made on the day before Prime Minister Kevin Rudd made the Apology to Australia's Indigenous peoples, a Welcome to Country has been incorporated into the ceremonial opening of the Parliament of Australia, an event which occurs after each federal election. The Welcome includes a speech as well as traditional music and dance. Given that Parliament sits in Canberra, traditionally part of Ngambri country, a Ngambri elder officiates.

Significance
Aboriginal and Torres Strait Islander peoples were largely excluded from Australian history books and from the democratic process in Australia for the first two centuries of white settlement, since the colonisation of Australia from 1788. Including recognition of Indigenous peoples in events, meetings and national symbols is seen as one part of repairing the damage caused by exclusion from settler society. Incorporating Welcome or Acknowledgement protocols into official meetings and events "recognises Aboriginal and Torres Strait Islander peoples as the First Australians and Traditional Custodians of land" and shows respect for traditional owners.

Description
Both Welcomes and Acknowledgements recognise the continuing connection of Aboriginal traditional owners to their country, and offer appropriate respect as part of the process of reconciliation and healing. As they have become more commonplace and people have become used to hearing them, efforts are being made by many to keep the words alive and make them meaningful. They may be used to inform and educate as well as being entertaining at the same time.

Welcome to Country
The Victorian Government advised that Welcomes are advised for major public events, forums and functions in locations where traditional owners have been formally recognised. A Welcome to Country can only be undertaken by an elder, formally recognised traditional owner or custodian to welcome visitors to their traditional country. The format varies; it may include a welcome speech, a traditional dance, and/or smoking ceremony.

Acknowledgement of Country

If a local elder is not available, or if the traditional owners have not been formally recognised for the area, an Acknowledgement of Country, also known as Acknowledgement of Traditional Owners, performed by the host of the event, is appropriate. If there is no formal recognition of traditional ownership, it is advised to limit recognition to an Acknowledgement of Traditional Owners generally, without making a reference to the name of any specific traditional owners.

The Victorian Government's wording for recognised traditional owners:

And for unknown traditional owners:

The City of Adelaide's wording is (specifically tailored for the local Kaurna people):

The words "always was, always will be Aboriginal land" are sometimes included in Acknowledgement of Country, as acknowledgement that the land of Australia was never ceded.

Other countries
Similar acknowledgements, e.g. land acknowledgements, have become common at public events in Canada and have begun to be adopted by Native American groups in the United States.

Observance and criticism 

Some jurisdictions, such as New South Wales, make a Welcome (or, failing that, Acknowledgement) mandatory at all government-run events.

As Welcomes to Country have become more frequent across the country, they have attracted criticism from politicians, historians and commentators including Bess Price, Keith Windschuttle, Andrew Bolt and Bill Hassell. Critics consider such ceremonies to be a form of tokenism, and claim that they do not reflect any element of traditional Aboriginal culture. Then leader of the Federal Opposition, Tony Abbott called it "a genuflection to political correctness" and that it "lacks heart". Price, a Warlpiri woman and former parliamentarian, characterised Welcomes as "not particularly meaningful to traditional people". Windschuttle calls them "an invented tradition". Hassell says that "Although I loathe and detest welcomes to the country, I sit through them patiently when we have these ceremonies".

The Victorian government overturned the previous government's observance protocols in 2011, and a municipal Council in NSW ceased mandating it in 2017. Critics such as Abbott and Windschuttle consider them "part and parcel of being politically correct".

Criticising the frequent practise of the Welcome/Acknowledgement to country, Senator for the Northern Territory, Jacinta Price, has stated "I've had my fill of being symbolically recognised. It's not the road to go down. We have to start treating everybody as Australian citizens and have the same standards for everyone", referring to it as a "throwaway line".

In popular culture 
The Australian band Midnight Oil released a single in August 2020 entitled "Gadigal Land", whose lyrics include a play on the traditional Welcome to Country as a critical review of Aboriginal history. Starting with the line "Welcome to Gadigal land", it goes on to mention smallpox, poison and grog (alcohol), which were all brought to Australia by the colonisers. The song urges reconciliation.

References

Indigenous Australian politics
Indigenous Australian culture
Ceremonies in Australia